Marion Lotout (born 19 November 1989) is a French athlete who competes in the pole vault. She competed in the Women's pole vault at the 2012 Summer Olympics. She has personal bests of 4.60 metres outdoors (2013) and 4.56 metres indoors (2014).

Competition record

References

1989 births
Living people
French female pole vaulters
Olympic athletes of France
Athletes (track and field) at the 2012 Summer Olympics
Sportspeople from Saint-Brieuc
World Athletics Championships athletes for France
Athletes (track and field) at the 2018 Mediterranean Games
Competitors at the 2011 Summer Universiade
Mediterranean Games competitors for France